"Sweet Yesterday" is a song written by Kye Fleming and Dennis Morgan and recorded by American country music artist Sylvia.  It was released in January 1982 as the first single from the album Just Sylvia.  The song reached #12 on the Billboard Hot Country Singles & Tracks chart.

Chart performance

References

1982 singles
1982 songs
Sylvia (singer) songs
Songs written by Kye Fleming
Songs written by Dennis Morgan (songwriter)
Song recordings produced by Tom Collins (record producer)
RCA Records singles